Pseudotropine acyltransferase (pseudotropine:acyl-CoA transferase, tigloyl-CoA:pseudotropine acyltransferase, acetyl-CoA:pseudotropine acyltransferase, pseudotropine acetyltransferase, pseudotropine tigloyltransferase, PAT) is an enzyme with systematic name acyl-CoA:pseudotropine O-acyltransferase. This enzyme catalyses the following chemical reaction

 acyl-CoA + pseudotropine  CoA + O-acylpseudotropine

This enzyme exhibits absolute specificity for the exo/3beta configuration found in pseudotropine as tropine (tropan-3alpha-ol).

References

External links 
 

EC 2.3.1